Mineral Bluff is a census-designated place and unincorporated community located in Fannin County in the U.S. state of Georgia. Its population was 223 as of the 2020 census.

Demographics

History
Prior to European colonization, the area that is now Mineral Bluff was inhabited by the Cherokee people and other Indigenous peoples for thousands of years.

Mineral Bluff was originally called "Douglas", and under the latter name settlement was made in the 1830s. The present name of "Mineral Bluff" was adopted in 1885.

The Georgia General Assembly incorporated Mineral Bluff as a town in 1889.

The community's historic train station, the Mineral Bluff Depot, is listed on the National Register of Historic Places.

References

Census-designated places in Georgia (U.S. state)
Census-designated places in Fannin County, Georgia
Unincorporated communities in Georgia (U.S. state)
Populated places disestablished in 1999
Former municipalities in Georgia (U.S. state)